Fox Family or Fox family may refer to:

Genealogy
 Fox family (English aristocracy), a noble family
 Robin Fox family, an extended family of actors
 Fox sisters, three 19th century sisters involved in the creation of the religious movement Spiritualism

Companies/channels
 Fox Family Channel, a former name of American television cable network Freeform
 Fox Family Films, currently known as 20th Century Animation
 A former name of 20th Century Family
 Fox Family, currently known as Star Fun

Other
A family of foxes
The Fox Family, a 2006 South Korean film